Jeirmarie "Jeimy" Osorio Rivera (born December 22, 1988) is a Puerto Rican actress and singer. Best known for telenovelas: Una Maid en Manhattan, Porque el amor manda, Santa Diabla and Celia.

Filmography

Theatre

References

External links 

Living people
21st-century Puerto Rican actresses
Puerto Rican telenovela actresses
Actresses from Ponce, Puerto Rico
1988 births